Mike Durkin (born April 14, 1953) is an American middle-distance runner. He competed in the men's 1500 metres at the 1976 Summer Olympics. He finished 3rd at the 1980 Olympic Trials to qualify for the Olympic team, but was not able to compete due to the 1980 Summer Olympics boycott

References

External links
 

1953 births
Living people
Athletes (track and field) at the 1976 Summer Olympics
American male middle-distance runners
Olympic track and field athletes of the United States
Place of birth missing (living people)
20th-century American people